Hannah Yakin (born Hannah van Hulst; 3 March 1933, in Amsterdam) is an Israeli artist.

During World War II, Yakin developed her artistic talents, experiencing "happy times in which necessity bore creativity".

After the war Yakin went to high school and studied art in Utrecht and in Paris with Paul Colin. In 1956 she emigrated to Israel where she met and married the artist Abraham Yakin. During the first years of her marriage she concentrated chiefly on the themes of pregnancy, birth-giving and motherhood. After 1965 she created two large series of etchings, one about evolution, the other about music and musicians. In 1978 she took up writing, this time in English. Some of her short stories were published in American and Canadian literary magazines. A number of her stories were recently broadcast by the BBC World Service. She has published three illustrated books in small editions, as collectors' items.

Publications
 Hannah & Abraham Yakin : Jerusalem, 1963
 A. Yakin, Hannah Yakin, 1969
 Hier is je bruidegom, 2004
 Jardena : dagboek uit Jeruzalem, 2008
 Hagadah le-Ṭu bi-Shevaṭ, 2017
 Mi-tokh ḳonkiyah = What's in a shell

References

External links
www.art-yakin.com

1933 births
Living people
Painters from Amsterdam
Dutch emigrants to Israel
Dutch women painters
Dutch women writers
Israeli etchers
Israeli people of Dutch-Jewish descent
Israeli women short story writers
Israeli short story writers
Israeli women painters
21st-century Israeli painters
20th-century Israeli painters
20th-century Dutch women artists
21st-century Dutch women artists
20th-century printmakers
20th-century Israeli women writers
20th-century Israeli writers
21st-century Israeli women writers
21st-century Israeli writers
Women etchers